Abila, also spelled Abyla, may refer to:

Places
 Abila in the Decapolis, ancient city in the Levant
 Abila Lysaniou, capital of ancient Abilene, northwest of present-day Damascus, Syria
 Abila (Peraea), archaeological site in Jordan
 Abila, Latin name of Ávila, Spain
 Abyla, Roman colony in the province of Mauretania Tingitana
 Mount Abila, mountain in Ceuta, autonomous city of Spain, in Africa

Other
 Abila (grasshopper), a genus of grasshoppers

See also
 Abela, a surname
 Abilene (biblical)